John Alfred Headlund (May 30, 1863 - January 2, 1943) was an American architect. 

In 1891, he went into the profession of architecture  in Salt Lake City. He became a member of the Utah Association of Architect in 1910.

He designed many buildings in the state of Utah, including the NRHP-listed Star Theatre, the J. G. McDonald Chocolate Company Building, and the George M. Cannon House.

References

1863 births
1943 deaths
Swedish emigrants to the United States
Architects from Utah
20th-century American architects
People from Scania